Clinidium argus is a species of ground beetle in the subfamily Rhysodinae. It was described by R.T. Bell & J.R. Bell in 1985. The holotype is labelled as originating from "Philippines, Horns of Negros", but this is considered questionable.

References

Clinidium
Beetles of Asia
Beetles described in 1985